Nephrurus cinctus, also known as northern banded knob-tailed gecko, is a species of gecko. Like all species of Nephrurus is endemic to Australia.

References

Geckos of Australia
cinctus
Reptiles described in 1963
Taxa named by Glen Milton Storr